Eremias intermedia (commonly known as the Aralo-Caspian racerunner) is a species of lizard found in Kazakhstan, Turkmenistan, Tajikistan, Uzbekistan, Iran, and Kyrgyzstan. Eremias persica is also known as the Aralo-Caspian racerunner.

References

Eremias
Reptiles described in 1876
Taxa named by Alexander Strauch